The Chataldja Army or Çatalca Army of the Ottoman Empire (Turkish: Çatalca Ordusu) was one of the field armies of the Ottoman Army. It was formed after Ottoman retreat to the Chataldja line during the First Balkan War. It confronted Bulgarian forces. It was organized from units of dissolved First Eastern Army and Second Eastern Army on November 7, 1912.

First Balkan War

November 17, 1912 
On November 17, 1912, the army was structured as follows:

I Corps (Commander: Ferik Ömer Yaver Pasha)
2nd Division, 3rd Division
South Wing Detachment
I Provisional Reserve Corps (Ferik Abuk Ahmed Pasha)
29th Division,
Ergli Redif Division, Kayseri Redif Division
II Corps (Commander: Ferik Hamdi Pasha)
4th Division, 5th Division, 12th Division
South Wing Detachment
II Provisional Reserve Corps (Commander: Mirliva Çürüksulu Mahmud Pasha)
30th Division
Amasya Redif Division, Yozgat Redif Division, Samsun Redif Division
III Corps (Commander: Ferik Mahmud Muhtar Pasha)
7th Division, 8th Division, 9th Division
South Wing Detachment
III Provisional Reserve Corps (Ferik Izzet Fuad Pasha)
Selimiye Redif Division, Fatih Redif Division, Afyon Redif Division
Chataldja Fortified Area and Artillery Command (Mirliva Ali Riza Pasha)
Right Wing Artillery Area Command
Center Area Artillery Command
Left Wing Artillery Area Command
Independent Cavalry Brigade

Order of Battle, March 25, 1913 
On March 25, 1913, the army was structured as follows:

Left Wing
X Corps 
4th Division, 31st Division
Amasya Redif Division
Independent Cavalry Brigade
I Corps
2nd Division
Fatih Redif Division
III Provisional Reserve Corps
3rd Division
Yozgat Redif Division
II Corps
5th Division, 12th Division
Ankara Redif Division
III Corps
7th Division, 8th Division, 9th Division
I Provisional Reserve Corps
29th Division
Ereğli Redif Division, Kayseri Redif Division
II Provisional Reserve Corps
Selimiye Redif Division, Aydın Redif Division, Samsun Redif Division
Mamuretülaziz Redif division (From Gallipoli)
Chataldja Fortified Area and Artillery Command
Right Wing Artillery Area Command
Center Area Artillery Command
Left Wing Artillery Area Command

Second Balkan War

July 12, 1913 
On July 12, 1913, the army was structured as follows:

Left Wing (Commander: Hurşit Pasha)
X Corps 
4th Division, 31st Division
Mamuretülaziz Redif Division
I Corps
2nd Division, 28th Division
Fatih Redif Division
II Corps (Commander: Hasan Izzet Pasha)
3rd Division, 5th Division, 12th Division
10th Cavalry Regiment
Right Wing (Commander: Ahmed Abuk Pasha)
III Corps
7th Division, 8th Division, 9th Division
8th Cavalry Regiment
Provisional IV Corps
29th Division
Aydın Redif Division, Ereğli Redif Division, Kayseri Redif Division
2nd Cavalry Regiment
Army Control
Ankara Redif Division, Amasya Redif Division, Selimiye Redif Division, Yozgat Redif Division
Independent Cavalry Brigade
Tribal Cavalry Brigade
Heavy Artillery Regiment

Sources 

Field armies of the Ottoman Empire
Military units and formations of the Ottoman Empire in the Balkan Wars